The North Tyrol Limestone Alps (Nordtiroler Kalkalpen in German) are a mountain range located in Austria and, marginally, in Germany.

Geography 
Administratively the range belongs to the Austrian states of Tyrol and Vorarlberg and to the German state of Bavaria.

SOIUSA classification 
According to SOIUSA (International Standardized Mountain Subdivision of the Alps) the mountain range is an Alpine section, classified in the following way:
 main part = Eastern Alps
 major sector = Northern Limestone Alps
 section = North Tyrol Limestone Alps
 code = II/B-21

Subdivision 
The range is divided into six Alpine subsections:
 Lechtaler Alpen - SOIUSA code:II/B-21.I;
 Lechquellengebirge - SOIUSA code:II/B-21.II;
 Wettersteingebirge - SOIUSA code:II/B-21.III;
 Karwendel - SOIUSA code:II/B-21.IV;
 Brandenberger Alpen - SOIUSA code:II/B-21.V;
 Kaisergebirge - SOIUSA code:II/B-21.VI.

Notable summits

Some notable summits of the range are:

References

Mountain ranges of the Alps
Mountain ranges of Vorarlberg
Mountain ranges of Tyrol (state)
Mountain ranges of Bavaria
Limestone Alps